The Museum at the Lowest Place on Earth (Arabic: متحف أخفض مكان على الأرض) is a museum located in the Ghor es-Safi, Jordan. The museum is dedicated to displaying different historical artifacts and archaeological remains.

History 
The idea with the creation of the museum dates back to the 1990s, the idea was proposed by Konstantinos Politis and the Jordanian Department of Antiquities after excavations in Jordan. The Arab Potash Company originally financed the construction of the museum in 1996. The Arab Potash Company asked George Hakim to design the museum building. In 2004, the government of Jordan financed the construction. In 2006, the museum building was completed. In 2007, the Ministry of Tourism and Antiquities of Jordan contacted the Hellenic Society for Near Eastern Studies to complete the design of some of the museum's exhibits. The museum was inaugurated in 2012.

Collections 
The museum contains collections of Bronze Age ceramics, Byzantine monastery mosaics. The museums contains Greco-Roman vestments, which were discovered at Khirbat Qayzun. The museum also has Christian tombstones from Zoara. In addition the museum contains a complete pavement mosaic from the Lot's Sanctuary site. The museum contains a laboratory for the restoration of antiquities, the antiquities that will mainly be restored are ancient mosaics. In addition, the museum contains 5,000-year old pottery dating back to the Bronze Age. The museum contains exhibits of handicrafts that come from communities in Jordan.

Gallery

References 

Museums in Jordan
Dead Sea
2012 establishments in Jordan